Chloe Lloyd (born 2 October 1992) is an English fashion model. In 2015, she appeared on the magazine covers of Elle Portugal and Norway.

Early life
She was born to parents Robert and Melanie Lloyd on 2 October 1992 in Cheshire, England. She has an older brother Dean Lloyd. She attended Ruskin High School before she studied performing arts at South Cheshire College.

Career 
Lloyd-Cuthbert is signed with Unique Models. In 2010, at the age of 17, she won the title of Face of Bank after beating thousands of models in the bid to be the new face of high street store's newest campaign. Soon after she got a modeling contract in 2011. Lloyd is represented by The Squad Management. Throughout the years, she has also modelled for magazines such as Cosmopolitan, Brides, Marie Claire, Glamour, and Vogue. In 2012, she was featured in the music video for The Wanted's song, "I Found You." In 2014/15, she modelled for NewYorker, Maybelline, Rubber B, The Body Shop, and Schwarzkopf. She has also been in campaigns for Thomas Sabo. She was on the cover of Elle Portugal in June 2015 and Elle Norway in October 2015. In December 2015, Lloyd left Storm Models. As of June 2018, she is signed with Squad Management.

Personal life 
Lloyd-Cuthbert has been in a relationship with Union J member Josh Cuthbert since late 2014. The two currently live together in London. On 14 November 2015 the couple announced that Cuthbert proposed to Lloyd whilst on holiday in Venice. On 9 August 2018, Lloyd and Cuthbert married at a private wedding in Aynhoe Park.

References

External links 
 
 Chloe Lloyd on Instagram

 Chloe Lloyd at Unique.dk

Living people
1992 births
English female models
People educated at South Cheshire College